Long Phú is a rural district of Sóc Trăng province in the Mekong River Delta region of Vietnam. As of 2003 the district had a population of 181,438. The district covers an area of 442 km2. The district capital lies at Long Phú.

References

Districts of Sóc Trăng province